Ashleigh Moolman Pasio (née Moolman; born 9 December 1985) is a South African professional female road bicycle racer, who currently rides for UCI Women's Continental Team . She competed at the 2012 Summer Olympics in the Women's road race, finishing 16th and in the Women's time trial finishing 24th.

On 9 December 2020, she won the first edition of the UCI Cycling Esports World Championships, organised on the online cycling platform Zwift.

Career

She tried to start a career in triathlon but after discovering her talent in cycling, and a series of injuries, dedicated herself fully to professional road cycling.

At the 2014 Commonwealth Games, she won the bronze medal in the women's road race and finished 15th in the women's individual time trial.

In 2018 she finished 2nd overall in the Giro Rosa and La Flèche Wallonne Féminine. She also took the final podium place at La Course by Le Tour de France. In 2019 she placed 4th overall at the Giro Rosa and took 5th in La Course by Le Tour de France.

In September 2020, Moolman signed a two-year contract with the  team, from the 2021 season. In the 2021 Giro Rosa she finished in 2nd place and claimed a stage win on stage 9. In July 2022, she was named as one of the pre-race favourites for the first edition of the Tour de France Femmes.

Personal life
Moolman is married to semi-professional XTERRA triathlete Carl Pasio. Moolman has a degree in Chemical Engineering from Stellenbosch University, where she met her future husband.

Major results

2009
 2nd Road race, National Road Championships
2010
 10th Open de Suède Vårgårda TTT
2011
 African Road Championships
1st  Road race
2nd  Time trial
 2nd Time trial, National Road Championships
 2nd Overall Tour Cycliste Féminin International de l'Ardèche
 6th Overall Iurreta-Emakumeen Bira
1st Mountains classification
 9th Halle-Buizingen
 9th Durango-Durango Emakumeen Saria
 9th Open de Suède Vårgårda TTT
2012
 African Road Championships
1st  Road race
1st  Time trial
 National Road Championships
1st  Road race
2nd Time trial
 1st  Mountains classification, Grand Prix Elsy Jacobs
 2nd Overall Tour Cycliste Féminin International de l'Ardèche
1st Stage 2 (ITT)
 3rd Overall Tour de Free State
1st Stage 4
 5th La Flèche Wallonne
 10th Overall Giro d'Italia
 10th Trofeo Alfredo Binda
2013
 African Road Championships
1st  Road race
1st  Time trial
 National Road Championships
1st  Road race
1st  Time trial
 1st Holland Hills Classic
 2nd Overall Tour Cycliste Féminin International de l'Ardèche
 3rd La Flèche Wallonne
 4th Overall Tour Languedoc Roussillon
 5th Durango-Durango Emakumeen Saria
 8th Overall Giro d'Italia
2014
 National Road Championships
1st  Road race
1st  Time trial
 2nd Le Samyn
 3rd  Road race, Commonwealth Games
 4th Overall Emakumeen Euskal Bira
 5th La Flèche Wallonne
 5th Gooik–Geraardsbergen–Gooik
 8th Omloop Het Nieuwsblad
 8th Durango-Durango Emakumeen Saria
 10th Holland Hills Classic
2015
 African Road Championships
1st  Road race
1st  Time trial
1st  Team time trial
 National Road Championships
1st  Road race
1st  Time trial
 1st  Overall Auensteiner–Radsporttage
1st  Mountains classification
1st Stage 3
 1st 94.7 Cycle Challenge
 2nd Overall Emakumeen Euskal Bira
 2nd Giro dell'Emilia
 4th Overall Giro d'Italia
 4th Strade Bianche
 4th La Flèche Wallonne
 4th GP de Plouay
 6th Le Samyn
 7th Overall Festival Luxembourgeois du Elsy Jacobs
 7th Chrono des Nations
 10th Trofeo Alfredo Binda
 10th Tour of Flanders
2016
 1st  Overall Auensteiner–Radsporttage
1st Stage 2b
 1st  Overall Giro della Toscana
1st  Points classification
1st Prologue & Stage 2
 2nd Overall The Women's Tour
 2nd Crescent Vårgårda UCI Women's WorldTour TTT
 2nd Giro dell'Emilia Internazionale Donne Elite
 3rd  Team time trial, UCI Road World Championships
 3rd Overall Emakumeen Euskal Bira
 3rd Holland Hills Classic
 4th Overall Festival Luxembourgeois du Elsy Jacobs
 5th SwissEver GP Cham-Hagendorn
 6th Overall Thüringen Rundfahrt der Frauen
 8th Pajot Hills Classic
 10th Road race, Olympic Games
2017
 National Road Championships
1st  Time trial
3rd Road race
 1st  Overall Emakumeen Euskal Bira
1st  Points classification
1st  Mountains classification
1st Stage 5
 1st  Overall Giro della Toscana
1st  Points classification
1st  Mountains classification
1st Stage 2
 1st La Classique Morbihan
 1st Grand Prix de Plumelec-Morbihan
 1st 947 Cycle Challenge
 2nd Crescent Vårgårda UCI Women's WorldTour TTT
 UCI Road World Championships
3rd  Team time trial
7th Time trial
 3rd Overall Setmana Ciclista Valenciana
 3rd Overall Grand Prix Elsy Jacobs
1st Prologue
 6th La Flèche Wallonne
 6th Liège–Bastogne–Liège
 7th Overall The Women's Tour
 9th Amstel Gold Race
 10th Trofeo Alfredo Binda
2018
 1st La Classique Morbihan
 1st Grand Prix de Plumelec-Morbihan
 2nd Overall Setmana Ciclista Valenciana
1st  Mountains classification
 2nd Overall Giro Rosa
 2nd La Flèche Wallonne
 3rd La Course by Le Tour de France
 3rd Team time trial, Open de Suède Vårgårda
 3rd Team time trial, Tour of Norway
 4th Tour of Flanders
 4th Liège–Bastogne–Liège
 6th Overall Emakumeen Euskal Bira
 6th Dwars door Vlaanderen
 7th Gent–Wevelgem
 8th Overall Festival Elsy Jacobs
 8th Strade Bianche
 8th GP de Plouay – Bretagne
2019
 1st  Time trial, African Games
 National Road Championships
1st  Road race
4th Time trial
 1st Emakumeen Nafarroako Klasikoa
 1st Taiwan KOM Challenge
 3rd Overall Setmana Ciclista Valenciana
 3rd Overall Tour of California
 4th Overall Giro Rosa
 4th Cadel Evans Great Ocean Road Race
 5th La Course by Le Tour de France
 6th Strade Bianche
 6th Clasica Femenina Navarra
 7th La Flèche Wallonne
 8th Road race, UCI Road World Championships
2020
 1st  UCI Cycling Esports World Championships
 National Road Championships
1st  Time trial
1st  Road race
 6th Overall Giro Rosa
 6th Durango-Durango Emakumeen Saria
 6th La Flèche Wallonne
2021
 2nd Overall Giro Rosa
1st Stage 9
 2nd Overall Tour of Norway
 4th Emakumeen Nafarroako Klasikoa
 7th Liège–Bastogne–Liège
 7th Brabantse Pijl
 8th Time trial, Summer Olympics
 8th Overall Vuelta a Burgos
 9th Amstel Gold Race
 9th GP de Plouay
2022
 1st  Overall Tour de Romandie
1st Stage 2
 3rd Strade Bianche
 4th UCI Esports World Championships
 4th La Flèche Wallonne
 4th Liège–Bastogne–Liège
 4th Durango-Durango Emakumeen Saria
 7th Amstel Gold Race
 8th Brabantse Pijl
 10th Trofeo Alfredo Binda

General classification results timeline

References

External links
 
 
 
 
 

1985 births
Living people
South African female cyclists
Cyclists at the 2012 Summer Olympics
Cyclists at the 2016 Summer Olympics
Cyclists at the 2020 Summer Olympics
Olympic cyclists of South Africa
Afrikaner people
Sportspeople from Pretoria
South African people of Dutch descent
Cyclists at the 2014 Commonwealth Games
Commonwealth Games bronze medallists for South Africa
Commonwealth Games medallists in cycling
Competitors at the 2019 African Games
African Games medalists in cycling
African Games gold medalists for South Africa
20th-century South African women
21st-century South African women
Medallists at the 2014 Commonwealth Games